The men's pole vault event at the 1932 Olympic Games took place August 3. Eight athletes from four nations competed. The 1930 Olympic Congress in Berlin had reduced the limit from 4 athletes per NOC to 3 athletes. The event was won by Bill Miller of the United States, the nation's ninth consecutive victory in the men's pole vault. Japan won its first pole vault medal, with Shuhei Nishida's silver. George Jefferson won bronze, extending the American streak of two or more medals in each pole vault to nine as well.

Background

This was the ninth appearance of the event, which is one of 12 athletics events to have been held at every Summer Olympics. No vaulters from the 1928 Games returned. The American team, this time led by Bill Graber after he broke the world record in the trials, was again favored.

No nations made their first appearance in the event, the first Games in which that was the case. The United States made its ninth appearance, the only nation to have competed at every Olympic men's pole vault to that point.

Competition format

With only eight vaulters, there was only one round of vaulting rather than the usual two. Vaulters received three attempts at each height.

Records

These were the standing world and Olympic records (in metres) prior to the 1932 Summer Olympics.

All three medalists (George Jefferson, Shuhei Nishida, and Bill Miller) matched the Olympic record at 4.20 metres. Nishida and Miller broke it, successfully vaulting first 4.25 metres and then 4.30 metres. Miller finished with the new record, clearing 4.315 metres when Nishida could not.

Schedule

Results

Jump sequences under 4.15 metres are not known.

References

Men's pole vault
Pole vault at the Olympics
Men's events at the 1932 Summer Olympics